Tiwaripur is situated in Kerakat tehsil, Jaunpur district, Uttar Pradesh, India. It is one of 425 villages in the tehsil and forms a part of Bisauri gram panchayat.

References

Villages in Jaunpur district